Yevsyukov (masculine) or Yevsyukova (feminine) is a Russian last name. Variants of this last name include Yevsikov/Yevsikova (/), Yevsyunin/Yevsyunina (/), Yevsyutin/Yevsyutina (/), Yevsyutkin/Yevsyutkina (/), Yevsyukhin/Yevsyukhina (/), Yevsyushin/Yevsyushina (/), and Yevsyushkin/Yevsyushkina (/).

There are two theories regarding the origins of these last names. The first one relates them to last name Yevseyev, derived from the Christian male first name Yevsevy, or its colloquial form Yevsey. But it is also possible that some of them derive from the Christian male first names Yevstafy or Yevstigney.

The following people share this last name:
Viktor Yevsyukov (born 1956), Kazakhstani javelin thrower
Vladimir Yevsyukov (born 1953), Russian football player and coach
Yevgeniy Yevsyukov (born 1950), Soviet race walker

See also
Yevsyukovo, several rural localities in Russia

References

Notes

Sources
И. М. Ганжина (I. M. Ganzhina). "Словарь современных русских фамилий" (Dictionary of Modern Russian Last Names). Москва, 2001. 

Russian-language surnames
